Alfred Duke (2 December 1866 – 11 December 1945) was a Scotland international rugby union player.

Rugby Union career

Amateur career

Duke played rugby union for Royal HSFP.

Provincial career

He played for Edinburgh District in their inter-city match against Glasgow District on 5 December 1885 and in the corresponding fixture of 1886.

He played for East of Scotland District in their match against West of Scotland District on 11 February 1888.

International career

Duke was capped 6 times by Scotland, from 1888 to 1890. He scored a try against Wales in the match of 1 February 1890.

References

1866 births
1945 deaths
Scottish rugby union players
Scotland international rugby union players
Royal HSFP players
Edinburgh District (rugby union) players
East of Scotland District players
Rugby union players from Angus, Scotland
Rugby union forwards